The University of Michigan School of Kinesiology ("Kinesiology" or "Kines") is the physical education and sport studies school of the University of Michigan, a public research university in Ann Arbor, Michigan. Established in 1921 as the Department of Physical Education, the unit became the independent Division of Kinesiology in 1990 and was renamed the School of Kinesiology in 2008.

Academics 
The school focuses on the scientific study of human movement and how physical activity and sport affect our quality of life, community, and society at large. The school offers three undergraduate degrees in Applied Exercise Science, Movement Science, and Sport Management; three master's degrees in Athletic Training, Movement Science, and Sport Management; and two doctoral degrees in Movement Science and Sport Management. It also offers an Intraoperative Neuromonitoring concentration option for Movement Science undergraduates. In 2020, the PhD program was ranked #1 by the National Academy of Kinesiology.

The School of Kinesiology houses 24 research centers and laboratories that focus on injury prevention and rehabilitation; movement for health and well-being; childhood physical activity and development; community impact; and the business of sport. School faculty also lead several university-wide initiatives, including the Exercise & Sport Science Initiative (ESSI) and the Michigan Concussion Center.

Public Programs
The School of Kinesiology also houses Kinesiology Community Programs, which offers activity classes, KidSport Summer Camps, KidSport Clinics, Lifetime Fitness, and an annual Health & Fitness Workshop.

External links
University of Michigan School of Kinesiology
The University of Michigan

References

University of Michigan
2008 establishments in Michigan
University of Michigan campus